George Parry may refer to:

 George Parry (cricketer) (1794–1872), English amateur cricketer
 George Parry (MP) (1600–1660), English lawyer and politician
 George Herbert Parry (1882–1951), Western Australian architect
 George Parry (Ontario politician) (1889–1968), Canadian politician
 George Parry (umpire) (1908-1979), South African cricket umpire